Minuscule 600 (in the Gregory-Aland numbering), Zε599 (von Soden), is a Greek minuscule manuscript of the New Testament, on paper. Palaeographically it has been assigned to the 14th century. The manuscript has complex contents. It was labelled by Scrivener as 463.

Description 

The codex contains the text of the four Gospels on 430 paper leaves (size ). The text is written in one column per page, 31 lines per page.

It has a commentary of Euthymius Zigabenus.

Text 

The Greek text of the codex is a representative of the Byzantine text-type. Aland placed it in Category V. It was not examined by using the Claremont Profile Method.

History 

The manuscript was added to the list of New Testament manuscripts by Scrivener. Gregory saw the manuscript in 1886.

The manuscript currently is housed at the Biblioteca Marciana (Gr. II,7 (979)), at Venice.

See also 

 List of New Testament minuscules
 Biblical manuscript
 Textual criticism

References

Further reading 

 

Greek New Testament minuscules
14th-century biblical manuscripts